Claudia Moatti (also known as Claude Moatti; born 19 February 1954) is a French historian specialised in ancient Roman Studies. She is currently professor of Roman history at University of Paris 8 Vincennes-Saint-Denis, and Adjunct Professor of Classics and Law at the University of Southern California (USC).

Career 
Moatti studied classics at the École normale supérieure de Sèvres in France, where she specialised in political thought and the crisis in culture that arose at the end of the Roman Republic and in the early Roman Empire, a period around the 2nd century BC to 1st century AD.

She earned her PhD in History at the Paris-Sorbonne University, and taught at the University of Paris. She is also a former member of the staff of the French Academy in Rome. She has done research on the history of the discovery of ancient Rome and the "invention" of Roman archaeology in the late 1980s. The first findings of this project is presented in her book .

Moatti has been a full professor at USC since 2004. She has published a number of books and articles. She is currently working on four books.

Selected publications 
 With Odile Bombarde, Living in Ancient Rome, Young Discovery Library, 1988
 À la recherche de la Rome antique, coll. « Découvertes Gallimard » (nº 56), série Archéologie. Éditions Gallimard, 1989
 US edition – The Search for Ancient Rome, "Abrams Discoveries" series. Harry N. Abrams, 1993
 UK edition – The Search for Ancient Rome, 'New Horizons' series. Thames & Hudson, 1993 (reprinted in 2001)
 The Birth of Critical Thinking in Republican Rome, Cambridge University Press, 2015
 Res publica : Histoire romaine de la chose publique, Librairie Arthème Fayard, 2018

References 

20th-century French historians
21st-century French historians
20th-century French women writers
21st-century French women writers
1954 births
Living people
French women historians